Big Brother Brasil 21 is the twenty-first season of Big Brother Brasil, which premiered on TV Globo on January 25, 2021. The show is produced by Endemol Shine and presented by Tiago Leifert. The new season was confirmed by Leifert and the show director, Boninho, on April 27, 2020, on the day of the live finale of Big Brother Brasil 20.

The grand prize is R$1.5 million with tax allowances, a R$150,000 prize is offered to the runner-up and a prize of R$50,000, to the third place. Just as the previous season, this season features 20 housemates divided into two groups: "Celebrities", composed of actors, singers, professional athletes and social media personalities, and "Civilians" composed of everyday Brazilians.

On May 4, 2021, lawyer & makeup artist Juliette Freire won the competition with 90.15% of the public vote over digital influencer Camilla de Lucas and actor & singer Fiuk. According to the Brazilian Institute of Public Opinion and Statistics, the first episode was watched by 43.7 million viewers, and in total 65 million tuned in during the first week.

The game

#FeedBBB 
The theme of the reality show is such that each housemate will use a cellphone to capture moments in the house during a time determined by the production. The cell phone only allows them to post photos and videos to #FeedBBB, and see what other housemates say about each other. It does not allow contact with the outside world.

FeedBBB introduced an app akin to Tinder called "Arrow" in season twenty-one, which housemates used to pick out their love interests in the house. The "HoH Podcast" is recorded weekly and published on the GShow website. The housemates can see when it is being recorded but do not hear the content.

Nomination Superpower 
Starting on the day the cast list was unveiled, the public voted to grant three "Civilians" and three "Celebrities" immunity from the first eviction period. The six selected housemates lived in a House Next Door and joined the Main House on Day 2. Then, one housemate was nominated for eviction.

Fake Eviction 
On week 6, it was announced that there would be a fake eviction. The winner of the Head of Household competition during week 6 would be given immunity during the following week. All final nominees guarantee their spot in the next competition. Instead of voting to evict, the audience would be voting to give powers to two housemates, the most voted and the least voted.

Secret Room & Power of Immunity Veto 
The most voted housemate is moved to a secret room and given a Power of Immunity Veto. This gives them the power to cancel the decision of the Power of Immunity Holder. This power is valid for two weeks and may only be used once.

Double Vote 
The least-voted housemate is given a Double Vote. This means that, in the Diary Room, their one vote is counted as two votes. This power is valid for two weeks and may only be used once.

Super HoH 
Along with its regular powers, the HoH would also be tasked with splitting their housemates into Haves and Have-Nots as well as choosing what and how much each group would be eating.

Power of Veto 
In some weeks, the nominated housemates compete against each other for one last chance to save themselves from eviction. The housemates nominated by the HoH are not eligible to compete and are guaranteed to face Brazil's vote.

Power of No 
At the beginning of each week, the previous Head of Household may or may not be given the opportunity to disqualify some housemates from competing in the upcoming HoH competition.

Big Phone 
Once in a while, the Big Phone rings, unleashing good or bad consequences on the nomination process for those who decide to answer it.

The Counterattack 
The counterattack is a surprise power given to either the HoH's nominee and/or the House's nominee in which they have the opportunity to automatically nominate an additional housemate for eviction. While viewers are informed when the power will be featured in advance (on Thursdays before the Head of Household competition even takes place), the housemates are only informed about the twist on the spot, during Sunday's live nominations.

Housemates 

The cast list was unveiled on January 19, 2021.

Future Appearances

After this 2021 season, Arcrebiano Araújo, who finished the competition in 12th place, appeared in No Limite 5. Arcrebiano also appeared in A Fazenda 13, where he finished as runner-up from the competition.

In 2022, Gilberto Nogueira appeared in Dança dos Famosos 19, where he finished in 8th place.

In 2022, Lumena Aleluia appeared on De Férias com o Ex Caribe: Salseiro VIP as original cast member.

In 2022, Kerline Cardoso appeared in A Fazenda 14, she finished in 9th place in the competition.

Voting history 
 Key
  – Civilians 
  – Celebrities

Notes

Have and Have-Nots

Controversies

Karol Conká 
Karol's behavior and actions towards other housemates garnered a very negative reception from the viewers and public personalities. This included Karol's encouragement of outcasting certain housemates, aggressive comments that sparked discussions regarding psychological abuse and prejudiced comments that ranged from gaslighting, xenophobia, religious intolerance and sexual harassment.

Accusation of xenophobia 
A comment made by Karol Conká on January 29 displeased viewers, especially from Brazil's Northeast region. She talked about the behavior of housemate Juliette Freire, who's from Campina Grande, Paraíba. "[They] said that in her land is normal to talk like that. I'm from Curitiba, it's a more reserved city", began Karol in conversation with Thaís Braz and Sarah Andrade, inside a bedroom.

Juliette's mannerisms, such as the way she expresses herself, talking more loudly and affectionately touching people speaking, were criticized by Karol: "although I'm an artist and run the world, I have my manners when I talk to people. I have a fun personality, but I don't invade people's space and touch them while I'm speaking. I find that weird", highlighted. The subject became a Trending Topic on Twitter.

Accusation of religious intolerance 
Karol was criticized during an argument with housemate Lucas Penteado. Lucas had said that his best friend was God, which garnered the following response from Karol on February 1: "oh, only yours? And where was your best friend during your moments of madness?".

Accusation of psychological violence 
During lunchtime on February 1, once more, Karol Conká involved herself in another polemic with Lucas Penteado, as she was rude to Lucas when he arrived at the kitchen for lunch. Karol had said to Lumena and Pocah that she would throw water on Lucas' face if he opened the mouth to speak, after Lucas has turned his back to the table. Lucas tried to sit to eat but was told to remove himself from the table, under the pretense that Karol refused to have lunch in his presence. Seeing that her words were directed to him, Lucas stood up and asked to be told when she had finished eating. "That's better, if you don't know how to shut up, it's better for you to leave", said Karol. Lucas apologized and Karol didn't mince words: "I don't forgive you, fuck you. Fuck you, go act like crazy outside the house, give up, I'm done." Lucas headed to the bedroom and Karol proceeded to speak very negatively of him in the kitchen. "I have no patience for people who act like crazy. If he's crazy, he shouldn't be here. If he's playing, making fun out of me, I'll act like crazy too, come on, you are only gonna eat when I leave the table, end of story. I don't care, nominate me for eviction if you want. I have my life and my very pretty career outside, got it?"

Karol's attitudes towards Lucas coupled with her already very negative reception due to her mistreating of Juliette in the first week, sparked bad repercussions in the social networks and viewers launched the tag #KarolConkaExpelled (#KarolConkaExpulsa), rejecting her actions. Artists such as former Big Brother housemate Babu Santana, actress Tatá Werneck and soccer player Neymar also rejected Karol's action and spoke in favor of Lucas. A group of viewers led by influencer Thomas Santana reunited in fort of Estúdios Globo, where the Big Brother house is located, and made a "panelaço" asking for Karol's ejection.

Due to Karol's polemics, on February 2, the GNT channel indefinitely suspended the release of Prazer Feminino, a TV show which would have been released on February 22 and would also have the presence of former Big Brother housemate Marcela McGowan. On the same day, the organizers of Rec-Beat, the largest music festival of Pernambuco, decided to cancel the singer's presence from the invited attractions.

Accusations of harassment

Karol Conká 
On February 3, Karol Conká was involved in another controversy, when she laid down with Arcrebiano in the backyard area of the house and was insistent on engaging in a relationship with him. Many viewers viewed the singer's attitude as harassment, as Karol was visually bothered despite deciding not to say anything. Arcrebiano's family released a note on his social media profiles, voicing their distaste for her invasive behavior and that they would be looking forward for Karol to distance herself from him.

Nego Di 
During a conversation after the Head of Household competition in the first hours of February 5, Nego Di had said that he preferred to not sleep next to Carla Diaz in the bedroom to not have to take away "the flute from the case", referring to his genitals, before proceeding to make masturbation moves. After his speech, singer Projota and Arthur Picoli (who laughed at his comment) voiced their distaste for the comment. Nego Di's words were widely criticized in social networks, in which the comedian had already suffered backlash from distasteful jokes regarding sexual assault.

Polemics with student groups 
During a conversation during late February 3 in the "Haves" kitchen, Lucas had tried to make peace with Nego Di following a series of arguments between them in the past few days. The comedian refused the actor's apologies and confirmed he would veto him in the next Head of Household competition. After that, he called Lucas a bad person, and, by the end of the discussion, said: "Wow, bro, for God's sake. This revolution you make, defending hobos."

After using the term "hobo" ("vagabundo" in Portuguese), Nego Di would be referring to secondary students who occupied school in 2015, during a protest against the state government of São Paulo due to budget cuts in education, at the time headed by Governor Geraldo Alckmin, of which Lucas was one of the leaders of the movement. Nego Di's speech sparked a lot of backlash, causing the release of a note from student movements and organizations, such as the Brazilian Union of Secondarist Students (Ubes) and the National Union of Students (UNE).

Colorism 
In the late hours of February 5, during a conversation in the colored bedroom, Nego Di, Karol Conká and Lumena Aleluia were mocking Gilberto Nogueira's skin color, questioning the veracity of his self-declaration as a black person, using pejorative terms against him, such as saying that he was "not black, only someone who needed a good scrub" and that his appearance was akin to a Neanderthal. At the beginning of the daily edition of the program, presenter Tiago Leifert gave a short comment about the polemic, besides saying that the show also sparks discussions about relevant subjects for the society, before airing the conversation between Nego Di, Karol and Lumena, which did not include more xenophobic remarks that were made against Gilberto and fellow housemate Juliette Freire, who are both from the Northeastern region of Brazil. On the same day, the show's executive producer, Boninho, in an Instagram post, showed that the search for the term "colorism" had a growth of 100% in Google following the episode.

Stimulation of suffering 
In an interview to newspaper Metrópoles, sociologist Silvia Viana, the author of the book Rituais de Sofrimento (Suffering Rituals), which analyzes the reality show's structure, said that Big Brother's production team was the main group responsible for the conflicts inside the house at the beginning of the show, based on the elements of the game.

A group of psychologists of ANPSINEP (National Articulation of Black Psychologists) signed a note criticizing the show for letting Lucas suffer attacks, including from black housemates and that such a situation reinforces the "racist structure".

Lucas's withdrawal and external interferences 
On the morning of February 7, actor Lucas Penteado decided to leave the show after being involved in many arguments with the majority of the housemates. His leaving was celebrated by most housemates, who were already on bad terms with him following an outcasting movement lead by Projota and Karol Conká, despite his insistence on apologizing for his prior actions. Before leaving, Lucas kissed Gilberto (the first kiss between men in the TV show) and came out as bisexual, receiving many negative comments from other housemates, some of them from Lumena (a lesbian psychologist), Karol Conká and Pocah, who disapproved of his attitude and claimed he was pretending to be bisexual in order to use the LGBT movement as a platform to benefit himself in the game. The housemates involved in the controversy received accusations of psychological torture, besides rising polemics with their comments and attitudes in the house, from Karol and Pocah (both bisexuals).

Victim of biphobia after the kiss, Lucas received negative reception from the majority of the housemates, who questioned his sexuality. Following that, politicians and media personalities condemned the prejudiced act suffered by him, making the LGBTI+ National Alliance release a note against such attacks; the President of the Alliance, Toni Reis, said that "associate attorneys are preparing to file a lawsuit against the responsible for the attacks". Minutes after his departure, Projota decided to enter the Diary Room, and audio from his conversation with Boninho, the show's executive producer, was accidentally aired during the live feeds; in the conversation, Boninho had convinced the rapper to stay in the game (as he had also threatened to leave following Lucas' constant controversies in the house), by claiming that production was unaware of Lucas' issues with alcohol, affirming that he "turned into a monster", besides saying that the nerves would calm down without his presence. In the night of that same day, Rede Globo, in an official note to the press, confirmed that the voice that leaked during the talk with Projota was Boninho's due to an "operational failure", but highlighted that "[they] always cared for the health and security of all of the housemates" and that there's a team of medics and psychologists available who offer support to all housemates, if necessary. Highlighted, also, that the situation has been resolved after a conversation with the housemates during the morning.

Fraud in Veto competition 
On February 8, in a conversation with housemates in the Head of Household bedroom, Karol Conká spoke of a supposed breach she had exploited in order to win the Veto competition, which are luck challenges; the competition consisted of the three players taking turns on opening hoses numbered from 1 to 21, with the winner being whoever decided to open the hose with the number 17, dousing the two other opponents. In the conversation, Karol said that she noticed some hoses were connected to the taps, and some were not, claiming to have paid attention to that and selecting the seventeenth hose after noticing that it looked different from the other ones. After the conversation, viewers accused Karol of cheating, as the players were explicitly told to stand above a marking on the ground from afar the hoses before deciding which one they would open; Karol had purposely asked to open the hose of number 20, which had been already selected by Arcrebiano seconds prior, in order to have an excuse to walk around the hoses and closely inspect them to find any possible irregularities that could lead her into picking the correct one.

Following the reveal, viewers started to ask for the cancellation of the challenge on social media networks, garnering support from many celebrities and former Big Brother housemates, by claiming that the network's allowance of Karol's exploit during the challenge was an attempt of further keeping her in the competition for ratings (albeit negative ones) by saving her from the block and almost certain eviction, following her constant negative behavior in the house that had long sparked criticism from both viewers and housemates. Arcrebiano's team published a note requesting a review of the competition by the show's production team, requesting a redo of the competition or for the nominations to be cancelled should the fraud be confirmed.

The show's production team informed that the challenge result would not be cancelled and that the nominations would still be valid. In a note addressing the viewers, TV Globo highlighted that the hoses were not real and that the water system was opened manually by the direction once the hose of number 17 was chosen, citing Karol's strategy and supposed exploit of the challenge as nothing more than luck.

Ratings and reception

Brazilian ratings 
All numbers are in points and provided by Kantar Ibope Media.

References

External links
 

21
2021 Brazilian television seasons
Television series impacted by the COVID-19 pandemic